This is a list of German television related events from 1971.

Events 
 3 April – West German's entrant Katja Ebstein finishes third at the Eurovision Song Contest 1971 in Dublin.

Debuts

ARD
 24 January –  (1971)
 7 March – Die Sendung mit der Maus (1971–Present)
 16 May –  (1971)
 18 July –  (1971)
 11 September – The New Adventures of Vidocq (1971–1973)
 30 November –  (1971)
 25 December – Peer Gynt (1971)

ZDF
 13 January – Diamantendetektiv Dick Donald (1971)
 13 February - Disco (1971-1982)
 21 February –  Tingeltangel (1971)
 27 April – Quentin Durward (1971)
 13 August – Gestrickte Spuren (1971)
 31 October – Narrenspiegel (1971)
 5 December –  (1971)

DFF
 8 January –  Rottenknechte (1971)
 27 June – Polizeiruf 110 (1971–Present)
 13 August –  Tod eines Millionärs (1971)
 11 September – Die Verschworenen (1971)
 17 October –  Verwandte und Bekannte (1971)

Ending this year
 Königlich Bayerisches Amtsgericht (since 1969)
 Der Kurier der Kaiserin (since 1970)
 Die Unverbesserlichen (since 1965)